The Isle of Ewe is a small Scottish island on the west coast of Ross and Cromarty. The island is inhabited by a single family, the Grants, who have lived at the Main House in the south of the island since the mid-19th century.

The island is privately owned by J.I.H. Macdonald-Buchanan and leased to the Grants. The island previously had more families, but these left during the Second World War, when Loch Ewe was used as an important naval anchorage.

Origin of the name
There are two competing theories about the meaning of the name; it may be derived from the Old Irish eo, "yew tree", or alternatively from the Gaelic eubh, "echo", reflecting a place-name on the adjoining mainland.

Geography and geology

The Isle of Ewe is located in Loch Ewe, west of Aultbea in the Ross and Cromarty district of the Highland Region. The island is made up of two principal types of sandstone (Torridonian with acidic soil in the north, Permian or Triassic with more fertile soil in the south) and the shore line varies from flat pebble beaches to cliffs.  It is part of the Wester Ross National Scenic Area, one of 40 in Scotland.

The island was originally wooded, as recorded in 1549 by Donald Monro who wrote in his Description of the Western Isles of Scotland: "Ellan Ew, haffe myle in length, full of woods, guid for thieves to wait upon uther mens gaire. It perteins to M’Enzie." Similarly, George Buchanan wrote in his Rerum Scoticarum Historia (History of Scotland) of 1579 that the island was "almost all covered with woods, and good for nothing but to harbour thieves, who rob passengers." Both Monro and Buchanan (who probably used Monro as a source) mistakenly located the island in Loch Broom, instead of Loch Ewe. By the time Black's Picturesque Tourist of Scotland was published in 1889, the Isle of Ewe was "in a state of high cultivation; the fields large and well fenced, having been all reclaimed from moorland. There is an extensive dairy on the island."  Today the southern part of the island is predominantly low-lying farmland, while its northern part remains uncultivated.

A peaty hilly area called Sitheanan Dubha ("the black fairy hillocks") occupies most of the island's northern peninsula. In the 1880s, a group of boys reported seeing fairies at that spot. Immediately to the south are two bays – Camas Angus ("Angus' bay") and Camas Beithe ("birch-tree bay") – that afford anchorage to boats. The hummock of Cnoc na Gaoithe ("windy knoll") provides shelter to the two bays. The arable land begins a short distance further south beyond Druim nam Freumh ("ridge of roots"), where a small area of woodland stands. A jetty, built after the Second World War, provides boat access to the mainland.

The island has no regularly scheduled boat service, but access can be arranged at Aultbea.

Cultural references
Because the name of the island sounds like "I love you", it has become popular for couples to take boat trips around the island.

For the same reason, it was also featured as a desert island in the second chapter of Telltale Games' adventure game Tales of Monkey Island: The Siege of Spinner Cay.

The island's name also came up in The Goon Show, during the November 1954 episode "Lurgi Strikes Britain." Neddie Seagoon is informed that the "dreaded lurgi" has appeared on the Isle of Ewe, to which he replies, "I love you too. Shall we dance?"

See also 

 List of islands of Scotland

Footnotes

References
 
 
 Munro, R. W. (1961) Monro's Western Isles of Scotland and Genealogies of the Clans. Edinburgh and London. Oliver and Boyd.

External links

Islands of Highland (council area)
Private islands of the United Kingdom